"He Says the Same Things to Me" is a song written by Gary Geld and Peter Udell. It was recorded by American country artist, Skeeter Davis in 1963.

"He Says the Same Things to Me" was recorded at the RCA Victor Studio in Nashville, Tennessee, United States on November 15, 1963, precisely one week before the assassination of U.S. President John F. Kennedy. The song peaked at number seventeen on the Country Singles chart and later in the year, the single was issued onto Davis' studio album, Let Me Get Close to You.

The session was produced by Chet Atkins. The song was released as a single the following year (January 1964), serving as the follow-up to Davis' major country pop crossover hit, "I Can't Stay Mad at You". The single also reached the Billboard Hot 100, however it peaked outside the top-forty at number forty-seven. In addition, the single reached number fifteen on the Hot Adult Contemporary Tracks chart, becoming Davis' second entry on that chart.

Chart performance

Appearances in media
 In the film The Devil All the Time, this song plays on Tecumseh's jukebox as Deputy Lee Bodecker attempts to investigate the bar's back room.

References 

1963 songs
Skeeter Davis songs
Songs with music by Gary Geld
Songs with lyrics by Peter Udell
Song recordings produced by Chet Atkins
RCA Victor singles
1964 singles